"Spring" is an English-language single by German band RMB, which was released on 29 April 1996. The song peaked at number 7 on the German singles chart.

Track listing

Charts

Year-end charts

Certifications

Release history

References 

1996 singles
1996 songs